The Toyota Vios is a nameplate used for subcompact cars produced by the Japanese manufacturer Toyota, primarily for markets in Southeast Asia, China and Taiwan since 2002. Slotted below the compact Corolla, the Vios serves as the replacement to the Tercel (marketed as Soluna in Thailand since 1997 and Indonesia since 2000), which filled the subcompact or B-segment sedan class in the region. It is also successor to the entry-level variants of the E110 series Corolla in some markets such as the Philippines and Vietnam.

From 2005, the Vios was also marketed alongside its hatchback complement known as the Yaris in many countries globally. The second-generation Vios was released in 2007, which was marketed as the Belta in Japan and Toyota Yaris sedan in the Americas, the Middle East and Australia. The second-generation model shares its platform with the XP90 series Vitz/Yaris.

The third-generation Vios was released in 2013, which shares the platform with the XP150 series Yaris hatchback. It is marketed in regions outside Southeast Asia, China and Taiwan as the Yaris sedan. Through a major refresh in 2017, the Vios shares the same styling as the refreshed XP150 series Yaris hatchback. The heavily facelifted model also gained more global presence by local production in Brazil, India and Pakistan as the Yaris sedan. A separate, less major refresh was introduced for the Chinese market Vios in 2016 alongside a hatchback model marketed as the Toyota Vios FS.

In Thailand, the 2017 facelifted model was marketed as the Toyota Yaris Ativ, which shares the smaller 1.2-litre engine with the Yaris hatchback. The 1.5-litre Vios continued to be sold alongside the Yaris Ativ until 2022, using the Chinese market facelift styling.

The fourth-generation model was released in 2022 in Thailand as the Yaris Ativ. It was designed and engineered by Daihatsu using its DNGA platform.

The "Vios" name is derived from the Latin word "vio", meaning "go or travel (forward)", while Toyota marketed the car in Indonesia in 2007 with the backronym "Very Intelligent, Outstanding Sedan". In Indonesia, downgraded models of the Vios to cater for taxi fleet was marketed as the Toyota Limo through three generations.

First generation (XP40; 2002) 

The first-generation Vios, codenamed XP40, was assembled in Thailand's Toyota Gateway Plant in Gateway City, Amphoe Plaeng Yao, Chachoengsao Province, as part of a cooperative project between Thai engineers and Toyota's Japanese designers.

In Thailand, Sri Lanka, Indonesia, Singapore, Brunei, Malaysia and Taiwan markets, the Vios is equipped with a 1.5 L 1NZ-FE engine with VVT-i. The smaller 1.3 L 2NZ-FE engine is offered in the Philippines. In China, the Vios comes with the 1.3 L 8A-FE and 1.5 L 5A-FE. Trim levels for Southeast Asian markets include J, E, G and S, while the DLX, GL, GLX and GLXi are offered in China.

The Vios was adapted from the Platz with modified body panels and portions of the car feature design cues from the E120 series Corolla. Like the Vitz and Platz, the Vios features instrument panel mounted on the top center of the dashboard.

In September 2005, the Vios received minor cosmetic changes to its exterior and interior for the 2006 model year. Updates included the front bumper, headlights and tail lights, redesigned alloy rims, speedometer dial design, and added a console box in the interior.

The Vios was campaigned in the Touring Car Championships in Indonesia and One Make Races in Thailand.

Taxicab versions marketed in Indonesia have less equipment and is rebadged as the Limo. This is not to be confused with certain taxis with the same name in Thailand, which use Corollas.

Markets

China 
In China, the Vios was produced from 2004 to 2008 equipped with the 1.3 L 8A-FE and 1.5 L 5A-FE engines paired with a 5-speed manual or 4-speed automatic transmission. The 5A-FE engine was replaced by the 2SZ-FE engine and 3SZ-VE engine in 2006. Trim levels consist of the DLX, GL, GLX and GLXi trims.

Philippines 
In the Philippines, the Vios was launched in June 2003 with two trim levels; E and G. The 1.3 E was powered by a 2NZ-FE VVT-i engine, mated to a 5-speed manual transmission. It came with an analog gauge cluster and 14-inch 5-spoke alloy wheels. The 1.5 G was powered by a 1NZ-FE VVT-i engine. Additional features were foglights, power side mirrors and a digital gauge cluster. It was mated to either a 5-speed manual or 4-speed automatic transmission. The base model J was introduced in June 2004. It had no power features (except for Steering) and 13-inch steel wheels. The 1.5 S was added to the lineup in early 2007 featuring a sportier body kit.

Singapore 
In Singapore, the Vios came in E and S trim levels and powered by a 1.5 L 1NZ-FE engine. The top-of-the-line S trim comes with only a 4-speed automatic transmission. It has a digital speedometer, silver steering wheel trims, foldable wing mirrors, foglamps, chrome door handles and boot lid garnish. The E trim was available in either 5-speed manual or 4-speed automatic transmission and has a conventional speedometer.

Malaysia 
In Malaysia, the specs and engines are generally similar as Singapore, the only difference is that in Malaysia, it is sold in E and G trim levels and comes with 15-inch alloy wheels and mudguards, while Singapore versions do not.

Taiwan 
In Taiwan, the Vios comes with a 1.5 L 1NZ-FE engine in J and E trim levels. The first-generation Vios was sold and produced until the first quarter 2014.

Vios Turbo 
A Turbo variant of the first-generation Vios was made available only in Thailand, which only 600 cars were produced. It can accelerate from 0– in 8.1 seconds. About 600 units were produced. Standard on the Vios Turbo are a functional scoop on its hood, wrap-around body kits, stiffer springs, firmer shock-absorbers and 16-inch alloy wheels. Colours available were red, black and silver. The transmission ratio and differential ratios were based on that of a MR-S.

Second generation (XP90; 2007) 

The second-generation Vios is a renamed Japanese market Belta sedan with varying trim levels and equipment sold in Southeast Asian countries between April 2007 and March 2013. It was also sold as the Yaris sedan in North America and Australia. The model received a facelift in mid-2010 and the second time in 2012.

Third generation (XP150; 2013) 

The third-generation Vios (designated XP150) for the Asian market was unveiled on 25 March 2013 at the 34th Bangkok International Motor Show in Thailand. Its design was previewed by the Dear Qin sedan concept that was first displayed at the April 2012 Auto China. Toyota aimed to designate the third-generation Vios as a global model, for markets outside of Asia. The car was sold in Thailand shortly after, and from the second quarter in Asia. The exterior was enlarged over the front and rear sections and its styling outline was later followed by the XP150 series Yaris hatchback for the Southeast Asian market. The instrument cluster position is no longer mounted on the centre of the dashboard.

In regions such as Africa, South America, the Caribbean and the Middle East, it is marketed as the Yaris Sedan.

In Mexico and certain South American countries, the XP150 series Vios (for global markets) was sold as the Yaris Sedán. It was sold alongside the Mazda2-based Yaris R.

In 2017, a major facelift model was released, which introduced newer sheet metal, interior design, while sharing the same front styling with the Yaris hatchback. The platform was revised with additional weldings for more rigidity and also with additional emphasis on noise, vibration, and harshness. Based on Toyota's internal estimates, it saw an 11 percent improvement in this sector, with the dashboard alone received 40 percent more sound insulation than before. The facelifted model was marketed in Thailand with the 1.2-litre as the Yaris Ativ to be eligible with the Eco Car program, while the Vios continued to be sold with the Chinese facelift styling and a 1.5-litre engine as a more powerful alternative. However, the Yaris Ativ-based styling was used for most markets instead of the facelifted Vios sold exclusively in China and Thailand.

The XP150 series Vios/Yaris sedan, is not offered in the United States, Canada, South Africa, Australia and New Zealand. The second-generation (XP90 model) sedan was sold in these countries as the Yaris, but it was dropped in late 2011 due to lacklustre sales, with only the XP130 model being offered from the 2012 model year. Yaris sedans subsequently sold in North America from 2015 are based on the Mazda2 and produced for Toyota by Mazda.

The Vios has been campaigned in One Make Races in Malaysia, Philippines and Thailand.

Facelift 

The facelifted third-generation Vios was unveiled at the April 2016 Auto China. For the facelift model, there are projector headlamps with integrated LED light guides, a wider T-shaped grille and fog lamps shifted to the lower air-dam with vertical LED DRLs affixed on the bumper, similar to that of the pre-facelift XV70 series Camry. At the rear, the tail lamps feature LED-type units with revised graphics and feature a thinner linking chrome boot lid bar. This facelifted model is exclusively available in Thailand and China.

In most Asian countries (excluding Japan and Hong Kong), the facelifted Vios was sold from 2018 as a major facelift model and uses model NSP151 model code for the cars with 1.5-litre engine, or NSP150 for the 1.3-litre models. It is also offered in India, the Middle East and Latin American countries as the Yaris Sedan. Although the roof and chassis used are based on the Vios sold in China and Thailand, the body panels and interior of the Yaris Ativ-based Vios are different from the NCP150 Vios.

The facelifted Vios is sold in Singapore, Brunei, Vietnam, Indonesia, Malaysia, Taiwan, the Philippines, Myanmar, Laos, and Cambodia. In the first 6 countries, the Vios is offered with the 1.5-litre 2NR-FE engine, while in the last 3 countries, it only powered by the smaller 1.3 L 1NR-FE engine. Both engines are offered in the Philippines.

The facelifted Vios received a minor facelift in July 2020 with a redesigned front bumper and grille, with integrated DRL dual lens LED headlamp for the range topping models. It also received added safety suite for the range topping variants.

Markets

Thailand 
The third-generation Vios was launched in March 2013 with four trim levels: J, E, G and S. The J and E trims were offered in either manual or automatic transmission. A TRD Sportivo model was introduced in May 2015.

From 2016 in Thailand, the 1NZ-FE VVT-i engine was replaced by the flex-fuel 2NR-FBE 1.5-litre Dual VVT-i engine. The four-speed automatic transmission was replaced with a CVT gearbox with seven-speed mode. The five-speed manual was dropped from the lineup, while the safety kit has been given an upgrade. An "Exclusive" version was introduced for 2016 to replace TRD Sportivo model.

The facelifted Vios was launched in Thailand in January 2017, featuring the same front fascia as Chinese market model. Trim levels offered include J, E, G and S, later categorised as Entry, Mid, and High trim levels from 2018.

Singapore 
The Vios was first unveiled in Singapore in May 2013. It is available in two trim levels: E and G variants. Both are equipped with an automatic transmission.

In January 2017, the Vios was reintroduced to the lineup with the newer 2NR-FE engine and continuously variable transmission (CVT) with 7-speed sport sequential mode and was available for a short period of time until April 2017.

In December 2017, the facelifted Vios was introduced once more for the 2018 model year. The Vios for the Singapore market is offered in E and G model grades with only automatic CVT with a 1.5-litre 2NR-FE engine.

In January 2021, the Vios received a minor facelift.

Brunei 
The third-generation Vios was introduced to Brunei with J and E trim levels which are available with either 4-speed automatic or 5-speed manual transmissions. Between the initial production sourced from Thailand and Indonesia, the Bruneian spec third-generation Vios and Yaris hatchback were fully imported from Indonesia.

The facelifted Vios was launched in May 2018 along with the facelifted Yaris hatchback. Trim levels available are 1.5 E automatic and 1.5 J manual.

Malaysia 
The third-generation Vios was launched in Malaysia in October 2013, and was sold in five different trim choices which are J manual, J automatic, E automatic, G automatic and TRD Sportivo automatic.

In September 2016, the third-generation Vios received a newer engine and additional features. The 1NZ-FE VVT-i engine was replaced by the 2NR-FE Dual VVT-i engine across the lineup and the four-speed automatic transmission was replaced by a CVT with seven-speed mode.

In January 2015, April 2017, and January 2018, the vehicle received minor updates which mainly consists of additional features. In July 2017, a "Sports Edition" trim was introduced based on the J trim.

The facelifted Vios was launched in January 2019. The GX and TRD Sportivo trim was discontinued, leaving only J, E and G trim in the lineup. Manual transmission is no longer offered on the J trim.

In December 2020, the second facelift model went on sale. The same J, E and G trim has been retained. Alongside the existing trim levels, the GR-S trim was introduced. It is a locally engineered model and the first model to wear the GR Sport badge in the Malaysian market. The headlining features are the "10-speed CVT" – which Toyota programmed the stepless automatic gearbox to have 10 virtual ratios in its manual mode, and sports-tuned suspension. It is equipped with 17-inch black multi-spoke wheels. The GR-S trim is available exclusively at GR Garage outlets and Toyota dealers participating in the Vios Challenge, a one-make race series in Malaysia.

Philippines 
In the Philippines, the third-generation Vios was launched in July 2013 with the same 4 trim levels as the outgoing model: 1.3 Base, 1.3 J, 1.3 E, and 1.5 G. Toyota Motor Philippines produces the Vios in their production plant in Santa Rosa, Laguna. It is equipped with either a 1.3-litre 2NZ-FE or a 1.5-litre 1NZ-FE engine. In 2015, the TRD Sportivo trim with TRD alloy wheels and body kit was released. In July 2016, the Vios received a newer engine, the 1.3-litre 1NR-FE and 1.5-litre 2NR-FE engine with Dual VVT-i, both available with both 5-speed manual and CVT transmission.

The facelifted Vios was launched in July 2018. Trim levels on offer are the 1.3 Base, 1.3 J, 1.3 E, 1.5 G, and two newer trim levels, the 1.3 E Prime and 1.5 G Prime, which replaced the TRD Sportivo trim. In April 2019, the XE trim was added into the lineup. In November 2019, the XLE trim was also added into the lineup. In July 2020, the second facelift model was released, along with additional features and the E Prime and G Prime trims had removed at the same time. In March 2021, the GR-S trim was added to the lineup.

It is also the flagship taxi of the Philippines.

Indonesia 
The third-generation Vios was launched for the Indonesian market in May 2013 and initially imported from Thailand. Starting from December 2013, the Vios had been made locally assembled in Karawang, where most of the vehicles were exported to GCC countries as the Yaris sedan. It was the only sedan model to be manufactured at TMMIN Karawang Plant 2. Two trim levels were available; the 1.5 E and 1.5 G which were powered by the 1.5-litre 1NZ-FE engine. The TRD Sportivo trim was launched in September 2014. A downgraded model was sold for the fleet taxi market as the Limo.

The Vios received an update in November 2016 with the newer 1.5-litre 2NR-FE Dual VVT-i engine mated to a 5-speed manual transmission or CVT along with minor cosmetic updates.

The major facelift Vios was launched in April 2018. Only the E and G were offered, the TRD Sportivo was discontinued. The Limo model was replaced by the Avanza-based Transmover.

The second facelift model was not released due to limited demand of the sedan in the country.

Vietnam 
In Vietnam, the Vios is offered in 2 trim levels; E (5-speed manual and CVT) and G (CVT). All trims have the 1.5-litre engine. The first and second facelift models based on the Yaris Ativ sedan was launched in August 2018 and February 2021 respectively, the trim levels are carried over from the pre-facelift model and in the 2021 facelift, the GR-S model was also added to the lineup.

The model is the best-selling car in Vietnam continuously from 2014 to 2018, with 67,787 cars sold during the period. The Vios continued at the top of yearly sales charts through to 2020.

Taiwan 
In Taiwan, the third-generation Vios was available from the second quarter of 2014. Three models have since been available in Classic, Elegant and Luxury variants. All models use the same 1.5 L 1NZ-FE engine from the previous model. In the second quarter of 2016, the 1NZ-FE engine was replaced by the 2NR-FE engine and a CVT.

In March 2018, the facelift model with a refreshed exterior was launched.

China 
The Vios was launched in China in November 2013 after its debut at the Shanghai Auto Show in April. The Vios is now only available in either 1.3- or 1.5-litre engine variants with the higher end 1.6 L model dropped. The Vios for the Chinese market are produced by the FAW Toyota joint venture. Both models are powered by newer Dual VVT-i engines 4NR-FE and 5NR-FE specially developed for the Chinese market.

In 2016, a facelifted hatchback version of the third-generation Vios was launched exclusively in China by the FAW Toyota joint venture. Based on the Yaris hatchback, it is known as the Vios FS. The Chinese market also received the Vios-based Yaris L sedan. A 5-speed manual and CVT option are standard for both engines.

Safety

ASEAN NCAP

Fourth generation (AC100; 2022) 

The fourth-generation Vios (designated AC100) debuted on 9 August 2022 in Thailand as the Yaris Ativ (the "Vios" nameplate had discontinued there). It is developed by Daihatsu through a joint Toyota-Daihatsu internal company known as Emerging Market Compact Car Company (EMCC) under the lead of executive chief engineer Hideyuki Kamino.

The fourth-generation Vios is based on the DNGA-B platform shared with the W100 series Avanza/Veloz, although unlike any other Daihatsu-developed models, the Daihatsu-badged equivalency is not offered. Compared to its predecessor, the car features a fastback-like sloping rear roof section which stretched the window line further back.

The interior of the AC100 Vios/Yaris is said to be more premium in appearance than past Vios models, with many areas covered by soft touch materials and an optional 64-colour ambient lighting system. Other optional equipment include an electronic parking brake, a 7-inch digital instrument cluster and a Pioneer-branded speakers.

Markets

Asia

Thailand 
The Yaris Ativ in Thailand is available in four grades: Sport, Smart, Premium and Premium Luxury. Advanced driver-assistance systems package branded as Toyota Safety Sense is standard. The model also indirectly replaced the 1.5-litre Vios in the country.

Produced at the Gateway plant in Chachoengsao, sales figures target in Thailand is set at 3,500 units per month, with exports planned to over 35 countries.

Laos 
Toyota Safety Sense is standard for 1.3 Hi grade.

Cambodia 
The fourth-generation Vios was released in Cambodia on 7 October 2022. It is only offered in Premium grade with the 1.3-litre 1NR-VE engine, paired with the CVT. Toyota Safety Sense is standard.

Indonesia 
The fourth-generation Vios was launched in Indonesia on 12 October 2022, and is imported from Thailand instead of being assembled locally. It is available in two grade levels: E with 5-speed manual transmission and G with CVT; an optional Toyota Safety Sense package is available for the latter.

Brunei 
The fourth-generation Vios was launched in Brunei on 18 December 2022, and is imported from Thailand instead of Indonesia from previous generation. It is powered by the 1.3-litre 1NR-VE petrol engine mated to a CVT in a single grade.

GCC 
The model was introduced in GCC markets such as Saudi Arabia, Bahrain and the United Arab Emirates as the Yaris in September 2022. Unlike the previous generation, the Yaris is imported from Thailand instead of Indonesia. The GCC market Yaris is powered by 1.3-litre 1NR-VE and 1.5-litre 2NR-VE petrol engines.

Malaysia

Americas

Costa Rica 
The fourth-generation Vios was released in Costa Rica on 10 October 2022 as the Yaris sedan. Powered by the 1.5-litre 2NR-VE engine as standard powertrain, it is offered in New Line (manual and CVT) and Highline (CVT only) grade levels. Toyota Safety Sense is standard for Highline grade.

Mexico 
The fourth-generation Vios was released in Mexico on 12 October 2022 as the Yaris sedan. Powered by the 1.5-litre 2NR-VE engine as standard powertrain, it is offered in Base (manual and CVT), S (manual and CVT) and S Hi (CVT only) grade levels. Toyota Safety Sense is standard for S Hi grade.

Peru 
The fourth-generation Vios was released in Peru on 2 November 2022 as the Yaris sedan. Powered by the 1.3-litre 1NR-VE engine as standard powertrain, it is offered in Base (manual) and GLi (manual and CVT) grade levels, with LPG and CNG versions are also available as options.

Sales 

Notes: The sales data above only apply to models sold under the Toyota Vios nameplate (except for Thailand, 2004 - 2007 which include Toyota Soluna Vios and Indonesia which include Toyota Limo).The Toyota Soluna, Toyota Yaris Sedan, Toyota Yaris Ativ and Toyota Belta nameplates are not included.

References

External links 

  (Malaysia)

Vios
Cars introduced in 2002
2010s cars
2020s cars
Subcompact cars
Sedans
Hatchbacks
Front-wheel-drive vehicles
Vehicles with CVT transmission
ASEAN NCAP superminis